Grevillea scortechinii, commonly known as black grevillea, is a species of flowering plant in the family Proteaceae and is endemic to eastern Australia. It is a prostrate to sprawling shrub with serrated to pinnatifid leaves, the end lobes broadly triangular and often sharply-pointed, and clusters of brown flowers with a dark purplish-black style. There are two subspecies, subsp. scortechinii found in Queensland and subsp. sarmentosa, found in New South Wales.

Description
The lower surface of the leaves is silky-hairy.

Taxonomy
This grevillea was first formally described in 1883 by Benedetto Scortechini in the Proceedings of the Linnean Society of New South Wales from an unpublished description by Ferdinand von Mueller who gave it the name Grevillea ilicifolia var. scortechinii. In 1889, von Mueller raised the variety to species status as G. scortechinii in the Second Systematic Census of Australian Plants.

In 1989, Donald McGillivray described two subspecies of G. scortechinii and the names are accepted by the Australian Plant Census:
Flowering occurs from February to March.
 Grevillea scortechinii (F.Muell. ex Scort.) Flowering occurs in October and November.

Distribution and habitat
Black grevillea grows in woodland often on granite or in remnant roadside vegetation. Subspecies sarmentosa occurs near Guyra in New South Wales and subsp. scortechenii between Stanthorpe and Cottonvale in Queensland.

Conservation status
Subspecies sarmentosa is listed as "vulnerable" under the New South Wales Government Biodiversity Conservation Act and subsp. scortechenii is listed as "critically endangered" under the Australian Government Environment Protection and Biodiversity Conservation Act 1999.

References

scortechinii
Flora of New South Wales
Flora of Queensland
Proteales of Australia
Plants described in 1883